Byron Lawson (born August 26, 1968) is a Canadian actor of Chinese, Japanese and Korean descent. He portrayed gangster Eddie Kim in the 2006 film Snakes on a Plane.

His past credits have included the television series These Arms of Mine, as well as episodes of Highlander: The Series, Andromeda, Alienated, Killer Instinct and Godiva's. He also had a supporting role in ABC Family's Fallen miniseries. He played the head of security in the post-apocalypse series Jeremiah. He played a role in ABC Family's Samurai Girl.

Filmography

References

External links

Byron's personal website

1976 births
Living people
Canadian male film actors
Canadian male television actors
Canadian male actors of Chinese descent
Canadian male actors of Korean descent
Canadian male actors of Japanese descent
Male actors from Vancouver